The Hellenic Electroacoustic Music Composers Association (HELMCA) is the only national association of electroacoustic music in Greece. It is registered as a nonprofit organization (act. 1059.91/2001). Its members are active composers and sound artists who creatively use advances in music technology, producing a variety of musical forms of sonic art in their work. HELMCA became the official Greek federation of the International Confederation of Electroacoustic Music (ICEM) in June 2006, and it is the national member of the IREM (International Rostrum of Elactroacoustic Music, a part of UNESCO). It has more than 70 members, and organizes national and international events.

HELMCA was founded in 2002, as a result of a new interest in electroacoustic music in Greece. This period has been characterized by a number of emerging composers, with national and international activity in festivals and distinction in competitions. Courses in music technology and electroacoustic music are part of the curriculum in higher-education institutes.

Aims 
Among the future aims of HELMCA are:
 Development of the sonic arts in Greece
 Promotion of sonic art in Greece, Europe and worldwide
 Strengthening collaboration and solidarity
 Protecting ethical and financial interests

Previous aims have been realized by:
 Hosting cultural and scientific events
 Educational activities and initiatives
 Development of infrastructure for encouraging artistic and scientific research
 Publications
 Promotion and communication
 Participation in national and international artistic and scientific festivals, conferences and competitions

Activities 
Many of HELMCA's activities are part of international partnerships and collaborations:
 ICEM CD recording with HELMCA participation, France 2008
 Festival Synthèse, Bourges, France 2008
 CIME-AMEE concert, Valencia, Spain 2008
 HELMCA concert at SARC, Belfast 2008
 RTP - Música Contemporãnea, Portugal 2008
 ICEM + Elevkonsert på IDKA Kulturkiosken, Sweden 2008
 Participation at the International Rostrum of Electroacoustic Music, Lisbon, Portugal 2007
 Participation at the 15th Audio Art Festival, Kraków, Poland 2007
 CEMAT (Centri musicali attrezzati – Federation of Italian Electroacoustic Music Centers) international series of electroacoustic music, Rome, Italy 2006
 Festival Synthèse, Bourges, France 2006

Electroacoustic Music Days

The Electroacoustic Music Days is an annual event which takes place in various cities and institutions throughout Greece. During these event, some of the latest electroacoustic works from Greece and abroad are showcased:
 Corfu 2022
 Ioannina 2021
 Rethymno 2020
 Athens 2019
 Corfu 2018
 Rethymno 2017
 Liksouri 2016
 Corfu 2015
 Rethymno 2014
 Corfu 2013
 Liksouri 2012
 Rethymno 2011
 Corfu 2010
 Liksouri 2009
 Rethymno 2008
 Liksouri 2007
 Corfu 2006
 Rethymno 2005
 Corfu, 2004
 Corfu 2003
 Corfu 2002

See also
List of electronic music festivals
Live electronic music
Electronic art music
Sound art
Experimental music

Notes

External links 
HELMCA – Hellenic Electroacoustic Music Composers Association]

Electronic music organizations
Music organizations based in Greece
Music-related professional associations